Club de Deportes Aviación was a Chilean association football club based in the commune of El Bosque,  Santiago. The club was founded in 1957 by the Chilean Air Force and played in professional leagues between 1972 and 1981, when it was dissolved.

In 1973, it won the second-tier competition of Chilean football.

National honours
Regional Zona Central: 1
1971

Segunda Division: 1
1973

Records
Record Primera División victory — 6–2 v. Coquimbo Unido (1979)
Record Primera División defeat — 0–6 v. Huachipato (1975), Universidad de Chile (1976)
Most goals scored (Primera División matches) — 61, Ricardo Fabbiani
Primera División Best Position  — 8th (1977), (1978)

References 

Football clubs in Chile
Defunct football clubs in Chile
Military association football clubs
Association football clubs established in 1957
Association football clubs disestablished in 1981
1957 establishments in Chile
1981 disestablishments in Chile